Safari boots usually have high uppers to provide ankle support much like combat boots and typically made from the likes of leather or canvas and in brown/tan colors suited to the arid outback environments.

Safari boots were in fashion during the late 1980s and early 1990s. Camel Trophy released the range of 'Adventure Boots' as well as various brands such as Travel Fox who made the 'world tour boot' with a side pocket.

See also
Safari Jacket

References

Boots
Australian fashion
1980s fashion
1990s fashion